Lee Hae-sik (born 13 November 1963) is a South Korean politician who has served as an elected official of Gangdong District of Seoul at various levels from 1995. Lee is currently representing Gangdong at the National Assembly with Jin Sun-mee.

Pre-mayor career 
Lee was the first president of the student union of his alma mater after it was restored in 1980

He first entered politics in 1992 as one of secretaries of Lee Boo-young who has served as a National Assembly member from Gangdong from 1992 to 2004. 

In 1995 Lee became the youngest member to join Gangdong District Council at the age of 31 and with the most vote. 

In 2003 Lee left conservative Hannara party and joined liberal Uri Party following his mentor Lee Boo-young along with Kim Boo-kyum and Kim Young-choon. After losing the election in 2004, he worked for his mentor, then-party leader, again as his deputy chief of staff.

Mayor of Gangdong District 
In 2006 local election, only Hannara party candidates were elected as Seoul's 25 districts mayors. In 2008 bi-election, Lee was elected as the mayor of Gangdong becoming the only non-Hannara party district mayor in Seoul from 2006 to 2010. He was also the youngest district mayor of Seoul to have been elected three times consecutively.

As a mayor Lee installed the stray cat food stations with help from volunteers, animal food manufacturer and Kang Full - the first of this kind in the nation - and adopted Trap–neuter–return policy to solve the causes of complaints on stray cats and improve animal welfare. Its "Eco-friendly Urban Gardens" where its citizens grow their own vegetables and fruits and the self-learing centre are other examples of policies that were first adopted in the nation under mayor Lee. The district also became the first Seoul's district to introduce "green," organic lunch to its students at schools.

Moreover, Lee introduced policies transforming the district into "children-friendly and healthy" city which were recognised by international bodies such as UNICEF and World Health Organization.

In 2018 he completed his final term as mayor without resigning for the 2016 general election. This has come to attention due to two consecutive mayors before Lee who all resigned for the general elections resulting in 4 mayor elections in 6 years.

Post-mayor career 
After serving as the Mayor for three times, the maximum term limit, Lee joined his party leader Lee Hae-chan's cabinet as one of party's spokespersons. He earned his party's nomination for the 2020 general election defeating the incumbent, three-term parliamentarian Shim Jae-gwon.

Education 
Lee holds two degrees from Sogang University - a bachelor in philosophy and a master's in politics. Lee also completed a doctorate programme on administration from University of Seoul.

Electoral history

References 

Living people
Sogang University alumni
1963 births
University of Seoul alumni
Members of the National Assembly (South Korea)
Minjoo Party of Korea politicians
Mayors of places in South Korea